Nerve Net is the twelfth solo studio album by British musician Brian Eno. It marked a return to more rock-oriented material, mixed with heavily syncopated rhythms, experimental electronic compositions and occasional elements of jazz. The ambient sensibility is still present on several tracks, though it is often darker and moodier than the pieces Eno is best known for.

The album released 12-inch and CD singles for the pieces "Ali Click" and "Fractal Zoom", both of which featured various remixes of the songs by the likes of Moby, Markus Dravs and Isaac Osapanin.

Track listing
All tracks composed by Brian Eno.

"Fractal Zoom" – 6:24
"Wire Shock" – 5:27
"What Actually Happened?" – 4:41
"Pierre in Mist" – 3:47
"My Squelchy Life" – 4:02
"Juju Space Jazz" – 4:26
"The Roil, the Choke" – 5:00
"Ali Click" – 4:13
"Distributed Being" – 6:10
"Web" – 6:21
"Web (Lascaux Mix)" – 9:44
"Decentre" – 3:26

2004/2005 Remaster
All Saints/Hannibal/Ryko (HNCD 1477)
On 28 June 2005, a remastered version of Nerve Net was issued with the following bonus tracks:
<li>"Fractal Zoom" (Separate Time Edit)
<li>"Ali Click" (Doo Gap Mix)

All Saints/Hannibal (HNCD 1477) / (HNCD1477ADV)
Some versions, including a promotional disc released in 2004, contained the following bonus tracks:
<li>"Fractal Zoom" (Mary's Birthday Edit)
<li>"Ali Click" (Trance Mix Short)

All Saints (ASCDA41) / Beat Records (BRC-101)
Yet other versions, instead of bonus remixes, included an enhanced section with an "Ali Click" video by Jerome Lefdup and Lari Flash.

2014 Remaster
The December 2014 remaster includes no bonus material on the Nerve Net disc, but does include a bonus disc with the original My Squelchy Life album:
 "I Fall Up"
 "The Harness"
 "My Squelchy Life"
 "Tutti Forgetti"
 "Stiff"
 "Some Words"
 "Juju Space Jazz"
 "Under"
 "Everybody's Mother"
 "Little Apricot"
 "Over"

My Squelchy Life supposedly was to be released in September 1991, but as the release was postponed to February 1992, Eno decided to re-edit the album into Nerve Net instead.

Personnel
 Robert Ahwai – guitar
 Peter Anderson – guitar
 Richard Bailey – drums
 Duchess Nell Catchpole – vocals, voices
 Ian Dench – drum loop
 Markus Dravs – drums, drum programming, treatments
 Wayne Duchamp – alto saxophone
 Brian Eno – organ, synthesizer, bass guitar, guitar, keyboards, tenor saxophone, vocals, voices, multi instruments, treatments, African organ, animal sounds, Arabesque
 Roger Eno – piano, sampling
 Robert Fripp – guitar
 John Paul Jones – piano
 John May – voices, speech/speaker/speaking part
 Rod Melvin – piano
 Sugarfoot Moffett – drums
 John Moorby – voices, speech/speaker/speaking part
 Alice Ngukwe – tenor saxophone
 Winston Ngukwe – conga
 Isaac Osapanin – conga
 Anita Patel – voices, speech/speaker/speaking part
 Sunita Patel – voices, speech/speaker/speaking part
 Yogish Patel – voices, speech/speaker/speaking part
 Curtis Pelican – trumpet
 Robert Quine – guitar, rhythm guitar
 Gregg Arreguin – guitar
 Cecil Stamper III – drums
 Benmont Tench – percussion
 Christine West-Oram – vocals
 Jamie West-Oram – guitar, rhythm guitar
 Romeo Williams – bass guitar

Singles
In conjunction with Nerve Net, two CD maxi-singles were released.

Ali Click

Ali Click (1992) is a CD maxi-single of remixes of the song "Ali Click" from Brian Eno's album Nerve Net. It is also notable for including a version of "I Fall Up", a track from the withdrawn My Squelchy Life album, which is longer than the 3:42 version included in Eno Box II: Vocal.

"Ali Click [Grid Master Edit]" – 4:48
"Ali Click [Album Edit]" – 3:41
"Ali Click [Rural 'Doo Gap' Mix]" – 4:43
"Ali Click [Trance Mix – Long]" – 7:28
"Ali Click [Darkly Mad Mix]" – 4:09
"Ali Click [Grid Master Remix]" – 7:10
"Ali Click [Beirut Hilton Mix]" – 4:04
"I Fall Up" – 4:54

Fractal Zoom
Fractal Zoom (1992) is a CD maxi-single of remixes of the song "Fractal Zoom"  from Brian Eno's album Nerve Net. Tracks marked '*' mixed by Markus "Dravius" Draws. Tracks marked '**' mixed remixed with additional production by Moby.

"Fractal Zoom [Separate Time Edit]" * – 4:14
"Fractal Zoom [Mary's Birthday Edit]" ** – 3:50
"Fractal Zoom [Up River Mix]" ** – 8:10
"Fractal Zoom [Small Country]" * – 7:00
"The Roil, The Choke" – 5:03
"Fractal Zoom [Naive Mix I]" ** – 5:27
"Fractal Zoom [Zaire Mix]" * – 6:16
"Fractal Zoom [Naive Mix II]" ** – 5:56
"Fractal Zoom [Landed Mix]" ** – 5:55
"Fractal Zoom [Bucolic Mix]" ** – 4:44
"Fractal Zoom [Separate Time Full Length]" * – 6:26
"Fractal Zoom [Mary's Birthday Mix]" ** – 7:06

References

External links 

 

Brian Eno albums
1992 albums
Albums produced by Brian Eno